Events from the year 1760 in art.

Events
Autumn – Johann Zoffany moves to London.
Galleria nazionale di Parma established.

Paintings

Thomas Gainsborough
Anne Ford
The Artist`s Daughters, Molly and Peggy
Sunset
Tilly Kettle – Self-portrait, his first surviving painting
Joshua Reynolds
Laurence Sterne
Portrait of Mrs Day

Births
January 10 – Guillaume Guillon-Lethière, French neoclassical painter (died 1832)
January 20 – Ferdinand Bauer, Austrian botanical illustrator (died 1826)
March 2 – Christina Charlotta Cederström, Swedish artist, poet, and baroness (died 1832)
March 4 – William Payne, English painter, inventor of Payne's grey (died 1830)
March 6 – Dora Stock, portrait painter (died 1832)
March 16 – Johann Heinrich Meyer, Swiss painter and art writer (died 1832)
April 13 – Thomas Lawrence, English portrait painter (died 1830)
May 31 – George Garrard, English artist (died 1826)
June 11 - Maria Cosway, Italian-English painter, engraver, composer, musician, and society hostess (died 1838)
August 3 – Jacques Réattu, French painter and winner of the grand prix de Rome (died 1833)
October 1 – William Thomas Beckford, art critic (died 1844)
October 12 – Charles Paul Landon, French painter and writer on art and artists (died 1826)
October 31? – Hokusai, Japanese artist, ukiyo-e painter and printmaker of the Edo period (died 1849)
November 11 – Landolin Ohmacht, German sculptor (died 1834)
December 11 - Pierre Petitot, French sculptor (died 1840)
date unknown
Asensio Juliá, Spanish painter and engraver (died 1832)
Pierre-Antoine Bellangé, furniture designer (died 1844)
Giovanni Cendramini, Italian painter and engraver (died 1839)
Pieter Faes, Dutch  painter of flowers and fruit (died 1814)
Luigi Frisoni, Italian painter (died 1811)
John Christian Rauschner, German portrait painter and sculptor (died unknown)
Jan Regulski, Polish glyptic artist and medalist (died 1807)
Jacob Schnebbelie, English illustrator and engraver (died 1792)
Quirinus van Amelsfoort, Dutch allegory, historical, and portrait painter (died 1820)
probable – Lemuel Francis Abbott, English portrait painter (died 1802)

Deaths 
January 23 – Giovanni Antonio Guardi, also known as Gianantonio Guardi, an Italian painter, 1756 co-founder of the Venetian Academy (born 1699)
April 11 – Louis de Silvestre, French painter (born 1675)
July 18 – Philip Mercier, portrait painter (born 1690)
November 20 – Giovanni Carlo Galli-Bibiena, Italian architect/designer/painter (born 1717)
December 21 – Philipp Hieronymus Brinckmann, German painter and engraver (born 1709)
date unknown
Pierre-Alexandre Aveline, French engraver, portraitist, illustrator, and printmaker (born 1702)
Francesco Conti, Venetian painter (born 1681)
Domenico Quaglio the Elder, Italian painter (born 1723)
Yi Insang, Korean painter and government officer of the late Joseon period (born 1710)
Andrea Toresani, Italian painter and draughtsman of landscapes and portraits (born 1727)
Shen Quan, Chinese painter during the Qing Dynasty (born 1682)
Margaretha Wulfraet, Dutch painter (born 1678)
Yi Insang, Korean painter of the later Joseon period (born 1710)

References 

 
Years of the 18th century in art
1760s in art